Sogndal is a former municipality and small seaport (ladested) in Rogaland county, Norway.  The municipality is located on the coast in the traditional district of Dalane. The  municipality existed from 1845 until its dissolution in 1944 when it was merged into the municipality of Sokndal. It comprised the two harbor villages: the  Sogndalsstranda and the  Rægefjord. The river Sogndalselva reaches the ocean at Songdalsstranda.

History
The seaport village of Sogndalsstranda was built up around the Kjelland farm (historically spelled Kielland).  The farm (named after a spring (kilde) situated there) was owned by the Kielland family, from which Alexander Kielland descended. This family left Sogndal in 1751 and established a successful firm in Stavanger. The Kielland farm can still be found there. As is typical of older records, this farm is listed in historical records under a number of phonetically similar names: Kollandt in 1563, Kieldeland in 1567, Kuelandt in 1567, Tielland in 1610, Kielland in 1616, Kiedland in 1668 and finally fixing on Kielland since 1723.

The villages of Sogndalsstranda and Rægestad are located near each other and together they were granted ladested rights in 1798. Together, this ladested was called Sogndal (historically spelled "Soggendahl").  This status gave them a monopoly on import and export of goods and materials in the port and in the surrounding district.  

On 1 January 1838, all of Norway was divided up into municipalities according to the formannskapsdistrikt law. The ladested of Sogndal was put into the municipality of Sokndal. In 1845, the ladested of Sogndal was separated from Sokndal and became a municipality of its own. Initially, Sogndal ladested had a population of 348 while the rural Sokndal municipality that surrounded it had a population of 2,819. In 1875, the population of Sogndal had grown to 526, but decreased to 473 in 1885. On 1 July 1944, Sogndal was merged back together with Sokndal municipality, losing its small seaport status. Prior to the merger Sogndal had a population of 311.

Government
All municipalities in Norway, including Sogndal, are responsible for primary education (through 10th grade), outpatient health services, senior citizen services, unemployment and other social services, zoning, economic development, and municipal roads.  The municipality is governed by a municipal council of elected representatives, which in turn elects a mayor.

Municipal council
The municipal council  of Sogndal was made up of 12 representatives that were elected to three-year terms.  The party breakdown of the final municipal council was as follows:

See also
List of former municipalities of Norway

References

Sokndal
Former cities in Norway
Former municipalities of Norway
1845 establishments in Norway
1944 disestablishments in Norway